London Particular is a 1952 mystery crime novel by the British writer Christianna Brand. It is the fifth in a series of novels featuring her fictional police detective Inspector Cockrill and also portrays another of her characters Inspector Charlesworth. It was published in the United States in 1953 under the alternative title of Fog of Doubt.

Synopsis
During a dense London fog, a Belgian man Raoul Vernet has his head staved in while on his way to visit Doctor Evans and his family. Due to the poor visibility it is unclear who has committed the murder, although several have motives.

References

Bibliography
 Bargainnier, Earl F. & Dove George N. Cops and Constables: American and British Fictional Policemen. Popular Press, 1986.
 Reilly, John M. Twentieth Century Crime & Mystery Writers. Springer, 2015.

1952 British novels
Novels by Christianna Brand
British crime novels
Novels set in London
British detective novels
Michael Joseph books